Maida Coleman (born July 1, 1954) is a Democratic politician from Missouri. Coleman was first elected to public office in 2000, when she was elected to the Missouri House of Representatives from the 63rd district. In 2002, Coleman won a special election to the Missouri Senate, representing the 5th district. Coleman represented the 5th district in the Missouri Senate until 2009, and from 2004 to 2008 she served as the minority leader. She was the first African American woman to serve as Senate Minority Leader in the Missouri Senate. Coleman has served on the Missouri Public Service Commission since she was appointed to the commission in 2015.
 
While in the Missouri Senate, Coleman served on the following committees:
Administration
Agriculture, Conservation, Parks and Natural Resources
Financial and Governmental Organizations and Elections
Gubernatorial Appointments
Ways and Means

Coleman is a graduate of Lincoln University of Missouri with a degree in journalism. She has three children: John, Alaina and James. She currently resides in St. Louis, Missouri.

Coleman announced that she was running for Mayor of the City of St. Louis in 2008 against fellow Democratic Party member Francis Slay, but decided not to run on the last day to enter race, because another candidate with the same last name entered the race the very same day. Coleman believed that she was being "targeted" and claimed "conspiracy".  She announced she would run for mayor as an Independent.

References

Official Manual, State of Missouri, 2005-2006.  Jefferson City, MO:Secretary of State.

External links
Missouri Senate - Maida Coleman official government website
Project Vote Smart - Maida Coleman (MO) profile
Follow the Money - Maida Coleman
2006 2004 2002 2000 campaign contributions

1954 births
Living people
People from Sikeston, Missouri
Lincoln University (Missouri) alumni
Democratic Party members of the Missouri House of Representatives
Democratic Party Missouri state senators
Politicians from St. Louis
Women state legislators in Missouri
21st-century American women